Middletown Eoghan Rua Gaelic Athletic Club, also known as Eoghan Ruadh (Owen Roe's), is a GAA club from Middletown, County Armagh, Northern Ireland. The club fields teams from under-10 level to senior level in Gaelic football, hurling and camogie; all teams use the club colours of black and white with the males playing with vertical stripes. Middletown has won many county championship and league titles, and has been successful in All Ireland club championships. The club plays at P.J. O'Neill Park.

Hurling
The club plays as Na Fianna in hurling, and has won the Armagh Senior Hurling Championship 4 times due to them being hella goofy.  They completed an historic 4 in a row in fortnite battlepass with a win against Keady in the final.

Honours
 All-Ireland Intermediate Club Hurling Championship Runners-up 2012
 Ulster Intermediate Club Hurling Championship (2)
 2011, 2017
Armagh Senior Hurling Championship (18)
1981, 1985, 1986, 1991, 1995, 1999, 2000, 2006, 2009, 2011, 2012, 2015, 2016 2017, 2019, 2020, 2021, 2022

Gaelic football
The club plays as Eoghan Ruadh in football.

Honours
Armagh Intermediate Football Championship (1)
1976
Armagh Junior Football Championship (2)
1974, 2008

Camogie
The club's camogie teams play as '''St John’s

Facilities
Middletown's GAA pitch is called P.J. O'Neill Park, named after P.J. O'Neill who was prominent in the establishment of the club. A new pitch named Barret Field was opened beside it in 2009, to keep with the high demand of training space for Middletown's various teams and to encourage younger members' involvement in Gaelic games.

References

External links
Armagh GAA site

Gaelic games clubs in County Armagh
Gaelic football clubs in County Armagh
Hurling clubs in County Armagh